Galatasaray Handball Team is the men's handball section of Galatasaray S.K., a major sports club in Istanbul, Turkey.

Domestic success 

Turkish Championship:
Winners (2):İstanbul Handball League:Winners (8):''' 1945 to 1955

References

Turkish handball clubs
Sport in Istanbul
1926 establishments in Turkey
Galatasaray Handball